The 1986 Copa Perú season, the promotion tournament of Peruvian football.

In this tournament after many qualification rounds, each one of the 24 departments in which Peru is politically divided, qualify a team. Those teams enter in the Regional round (8 groups) by geographical proximity. Some winners went to the Division Intermedia and some others with some runners-up went to the National round and then to the Final round, staged in Lima (the capital).

The champion was promoted to 1987 Torneo Descentralizado.

Finalists teams
The following list shows the teams that qualified for the Final Stage.

Final stage

Final group stage

Round 1

Round 2

Round 3

Round 4

Round 5

External links
  Copa Peru 1986
  Semanario Pasión

Copa Perú seasons
Cop